Niklaus Brünisholz (born 7 November 1978) is a Swiss modern pentathlete. He competed in the men's individual event at the 2004 Summer Olympics.

References

1978 births
Living people
Swiss male modern pentathletes
Olympic modern pentathletes of Switzerland
Modern pentathletes at the 2004 Summer Olympics
Place of birth missing (living people)